The First term of Tung Chee-hwa as Chief Executive of Hong Kong, officially considered part of "The 1st term Chief Executive of Hong Kong", relates to the period of governance of Hong Kong since the transfer of sovereignty of Hong Kong, between 1 July 1997 and 30 June 2002. Tung Chee-hwa was elected in 1996 by 400-member Selection Committee as the first Chief Executive of Hong Kong.

Election

Tung Chee-hwa was elected in 1996 by 400-member Selection Committee as the first Chief Executive of Hong Kong. Tung beat former Chief Justice of the Supreme Court of Hong Kong Ti-liang Yang and tycoon Peter Woo with 320 votes.

Cabinet

Ministry
The policy bureaux were under several reorganisations during the term as following:
 Broadcasting, Culture and Sport Bureau was replaced by Information Technology and Broadcast Bureau on 1 April 1998 and
 Health and Welfare Bureau and Planning, Environment and Lands Bureau transformed into Environment and Health Bureau and Planning and Lands Bureau on 1 January 2000.

Notable change in office was the Chief Secretary Anson Chan resigned and stepped down on 30 April 2001. The post was taken by Financial Secretary Donald Tsang.

|}

Executive Council members
The Executive Council was presided by President Tung Chee-hwa and consisted of total 14 members: three official members including Chief Secretary, Financial Secretary and Secretary for Justice and 11 non-official members. All members are appointed by the Chief Executive from among members of the Legislative Council and other influential public personnels.

The Convenor of the non-official members was Chung Sze-yuen until his retirement on 30 June 1999. The title was succeeded by Leung Chun-ying.

Antony Leung became the official member of the ExCo on 30 April 2001 when he took the Financial Secretary post.

See also
 Second term of Tung Chee-hwa as Chief Executive of Hong Kong

Hong Kong Government